William Donkin may refer to:

 William Fishburn Donkin (1814–1869), astronomer and mathematician
 Billy Donkin (1900–1974), English footballer

See also
 Donkin (surname)